Johan Reidar Martiniuson (4 July 1893 – 4 June 1968) was a Norwegian sailor who competed in the 1920 Summer Olympics. He was a crew member of the Norwegian boat Sildra, which won the gold medal in the 8 metre class (1919 rating).

References

External links
Reidar Martiniuson's profile at databaseOlympics
Reidar Martiniuson's profile at Sports Reference.com

1893 births
1968 deaths
Norwegian male sailors (sport)
Sailors at the 1920 Summer Olympics – 8 Metre
Olympic sailors of Norway
Olympic gold medalists for Norway
Olympic medalists in sailing
Medalists at the 1920 Summer Olympics